Rushall is a small village and civil parish in Wiltshire, England,  southeast of Devizes and  northwest of Upavon on the A342 between Devizes and Andover. The village is near the River Avon in the Vale of Pewsey.

The parish extends southeast onto Salisbury Plain and into the military training area.

History
There is a prehistoric or medieval linear earthwork on Rushall Down, one of several archaeological remains on the Plain.

Rushall appears in Domesday Book, as a large settlement of 105 households, with a church, at Rusteselue. Before 1086 it was held by Gytha, the widow of Earl Godwin, or by Harold, her son, but by the time of the survey, it had been given to the Abbey of St. Wandrille. There seems to have been a church present at that time. In the twelfth and thirteenth centuries, the manor was held by the de Aunay family and subsequently changed hands several times. By 1404 it was in the hands of Lord Hungerford, and his family remained in possession until it was sold in 1548 or 1549. By 1749 it had been sold to Edward Poore, who set about rebuilding or replacing the manor house and emparking the surrounding land.

Amenities
Rushall Church of England Voluntary Aided Primary School serves the surrounding villages, including Upavon and the British Army garrison at Trenchard Lines.

The modern village hall is shared with the neighbouring village of Charlton.

The Anglican Church of St Matthew is Grade II* listed. Parts of a 14th-century building survive; the tower dates from the late 15th or early 16th century. In 1812 much of the church was rebuilt in brick, and in 1905 restoration was carried out by C.E. Ponting. The benefice was combined with Upavon in 1924, but the parishes remained separate; today the parish is part of the Vale of Pewsey team ministry, which covers Pewsey and many rural parishes.

Governance
The civil parish elects a parish council. All significant local government services are provided by Wiltshire Council, with its headquarters in Trowbridge, and the parish is represented there by Paul Oatway, who succeeded Brigadier Robert Hall in 2013. In the House of Commons the parish is part of the Devizes constituency.

Further reading

References

External links
Rushall community website

Villages in Wiltshire
Civil parishes in Wiltshire